Allan Mwayenga (born 28 June 1982) is a Zimbabwean cricketer. He played twenty first-class matches between 2001 and 2005.

See also
 CFX Academy cricket team

References

External links
 

1982 births
Living people
Zimbabwean cricketers
CFX Academy cricketers
Manicaland cricketers
Sportspeople from Harare